Dorohoi County, with its seat at Dorohoi, was a subdivision of the Kingdom of Romania and located in the region of Moldavia.

Geography
The county was located in the northeastern part of Greater Romania, in the north-eastern extremity of the Moldavia region. Today the territory of the former county is split between Romania (north Botoșani County, with an area of 2,542 km²) and Ukraine (Hertsa region, with an area of 304 km²). It bordered northwest with Cernăuți County, to the north and east with Hotin County, south Botoşani County, southwest with Suceava County, and west with Rădăuți County.

Administrative organization

The county comprised five cities: Dorohoi, Darabani, Herța, Mihăileni and Săveni.

Administratively, Dorohoi County was originally divided into three districts (plăși): 
 Plasa Bașeu
 Plasa Herța
 Plasa Siret

Subsequently, two new districts were established:
Plasa Centrală
Plasa Lascăr

From 1941 to 1944, Dorohoi County was part of the Bukovina Governorate.

Population 
According to the 1930 census data, the county population was 211,354 inhabitants, of which 92.1% were ethnic Romanians, 7.0% were ethnic Jews, as well as other minorities. From the religious point of view, 92.4% were Eastern Orthodox, 7.0% Jewish, 0.3% Roman Catholic, as well as other minorities.

Urban population 
In 1930, the county's urban population was 43,707 inhabitants, 69.3% Romanians, 29.1% Jews, 0.6% Germans, as well as other minorities. In the urban area, languages were Romanian (71.1%), Yiddish (27.4%), German (0.6%), as well as other minorities. From the religious point of view, the urban population was composed of Eastern Orthodox (69.1%), Jewish (29.3%), Roman Catholic (0.9%), as well as other minorities.

See also
 Hertsa region

References

External links

  Dorohoi County on memoria.ro

Former counties of Romania
1859 establishments in Romania
1938 disestablishments in Romania
1940 establishments in Romania
1950 disestablishments in Romania
States and territories established in 1859
States and territories disestablished in 1938
States and territories established in 1940
States and territories disestablished in 1950